Fortescue Dave Forrest Airport  is located about  northeast of Fortescue Metals Group's Cloud Break mine in Western Australia. 

The airport is served by charter flights from airlines across Western Australia. The airport has the ability to operate with one Airbus A320 or Boeing 737, and has full baggage handling services.

Airlines and destinations

See also
 Graeme Rowley Aerodrome
 List of airports in Western Australia
 Aviation transport in Australia

References

External links
 Airservices Aerodromes & Procedure Charts

Fortescue Metals Group
Pilbara airports